A motorcycle bell, also known as a guardian bell, spirit bell, gremlin bell, biker bell, or angel bell, is a decorative metal bell that is attached below a motorcycle, often given as a token of good wishes while riding. 

The bell is usually about an inch long, made from pewter or other metals, and is given to a motorcyclist as a good luck charm, or a symbolic piece of protection to ward off bad luck while riding motorcycles.

History 
A gremlin is a mischievous creature of folklore invented originally to explain malfunctions in aircraft and later in other machinery from pilots and technicians. In a use similar to that of a dead bell at funerals, a "Guardian Bell" or "Gremlin Bell" was sometimes used by British and American pilots in World War II, to ward off "gremlins". When the American pilots returned home many of them continued its use as a protection charm when riding a motorcycle.

This custom is still used by some motorcycle riders today, particular riders of Harley-Davidson bikes.

The bells come in custom designs as well as duplicated mass production designs.

The "Gremlin Bell" has been patented in the United States, and is recorded in the Official Gazette of the United States Patent & Trademark Office, Volume 1290, Number Four.

Further reading 
 The Red Book of Luck

 Legend of the Guardian Bell

References 

Motorcycling
Motorcycle customization
Bells (percussion)